Maharajadhiraj Raj Rajeshwar Sawai Shri Sir Tukoji Rao II Holkar XI Bahadur  (3 May 1835 – 17 June 1886) was the Maharaja of Indore (Holkar State) belonging to the Holkar dynasty of the Marathas. His birth name was Shrimant Yukaji Jaswant Holkar. He was the son of Raja Shrimant Santoji Rao Holkar, from the collateral branch of the Holkar dynasty.

Biography 

On the death of Khande Rao Holkar II in 1844 former Maharaja Marthand Rao Holkar claimed the throne for himself, but his request, backed by many nobles, was not given by the British. Krishna Bai Holkar Sahiba, one of the widows of Yashwant Rao Holkar, suggested the name of the younger son of Bhao Santoji Holkar (uncle of Marthand Rao). The proposal was accepted and the 12-year-old Jaswant Holkar was installed with the regnal name of Tukoji Rao Holkar II on 23 June 1844.

The regency council, controlled by the resident continued. At the age of 16, in 1848, Tukoji Rao II began participating in the government formally. Krishna Bai died in 1849 and Tukoji further expanded his participation in the affairs and soon was granted all the powers (8 March 1852) on attaining 20 years of age. In this period many reforms were introduced.

In 1846 he married Maharani Shrimant Akhand Soubhagyavati Mhalsa Bai Sahib Holkar (known as Rukhma Bai, who died of cholera in Indore in June 1848). After her death, he married Maharani Shrimant Akhand Soubhagyavati Bhagirathi Bai Sahib Holkar and Maharani Shrimant Akhand Soubhagyavati Radha Bai Sahib Holkar. In the Indian Rebellion of 1857, Indore State stayed loyal to the British side.

He died at Maheshwar on 17 June 1886 and was succeeded by his eldest surviving son Shivajirao Holkar, born in 1859 (the first two sons had died in 1854 and 1857).

See also
Holkar

References

Knights Grand Commander of the Order of the Star of India
Companions of the Order of the Indian Empire
1835 births
1886 deaths
Maharajas of Indore
Recipients of the Kaisar-i-Hind Medal
Indian knights